Oddmund Myklebust (21 April 1915 –  14 September 1972) was a Norwegian fisher and politician for the Centre Party.

He was born in Sandøy.

In 1965 he was appointed Minister of Fisheries in the centre-right cabinet Borten. He remained in this position until the 8 November 1968, being replaced by Einar Hole Moxnes.

Myklebust was involved in local politics in Haram from 1945 to 1953 and 1963 to 1965, and in Sandøy from 1971 to 1972.

References

1915 births
1972 deaths
People from Haram, Norway
Centre Party (Norway) politicians
Government ministers of Norway
Møre og Romsdal politicians